Letizia Cicconcelli (born 7 October 1999) is an Italian group rhythmic gymnast. A member of the national squad since 2015. She is the 2018 World Group All-around silver medalist and two-time European (2018) Group All-around silver medalist.

Career

Junior
She first appeared in Italian National team in 2013, when she was a member of a junior group which competed at the 2013 European Junior Championships and placed 6th in Group All-around and in 5 Hoops Final as well. A year later, she competed as individual at the 2014 European Junior Championships and took 6th place in Team competition together with teammates Maria Vilucchi, Arianna Malavasi and Ginevra Fiore Parrini. She was the most successful amongst them and qualified for both apparatus finals she competed with. She ended on 6th place with ball and 7th place with ribbon.

Senior
In 2015 she made his senior debut at Italian National Championships where she won the bronze medal in All-Around behind Veronica Bertolini and Alessia Russo. She earned a spot to compete at the 2015 World Championships in Stuttgart, Germany. She and her previously mentioned teammates took 14th place in the Team competition and she placed 52nd in Ribbon Qualifications.

In 2016, she took the silver medal in All-around at Italian National Championships behind Veronica Bertolini. She also took bronze medal in Hoop Final and two silver medals in Ball and Ribbon Final.

In 2018, she joined Italian senior group and replaced injured Beatrice Tornatore at the 2018 European Championships in Guadalajara, Spain and won her first medals from this major international competition. Together with teammates Alessia Maurelli, Martina Centofanti, Agnese Duranti, Anna Basta and Martina Santandrea they won the silver medal in Group All-around and in 3 Balls + 2 Ropes Final, while they took the gold medal in 5 Hoops Final. Later that year they competed at the 2018 World Championships in Sofia, Bulgaria and won the gold medal in 3 Balls + 2 Ropes Final, silver in Group All-around and bronze in 5 Hoops Final. By placing in the top 3 in Group All-around they also qualified for the 2020 Summer Olympics in Tokyo, Japan.

In 2019, she and her group won the bronze medal in the 3 Hoops + 4 Clubs Final at the 2019 World Championships in Baku, Azerbaijan.

On 14 June 2021, she announced her retirement from competitive sport due to her back injury.

References

External links 
 

1999 births
Living people
Italian rhythmic gymnasts
European Games competitors for Italy
Gymnasts at the 2019 European Games
Medalists at the Rhythmic Gymnastics European Championships
Medalists at the Rhythmic Gymnastics World Championships
People from Fabriano
Sportspeople from the Province of Ancona
21st-century Italian women